Sebt Jahjouh is a town in El Hajeb Province, Fès-Meknès, Morocco. According to the 2004 census it has a population of 3,585.

References

Populated places in El Hajeb Province